Aberffrwd may refer to one of the following places in Wales:

 Aberffrwd, Ceredigion
 Aberffrwd, Monmouthshire